Pastorale 1943 is a 1978 Dutch drama film directed by Wim Verstappen and starring Frederik de Groot. The film was selected as the Dutch entry for the Best Foreign Language Film at the 51st Academy Awards, but was not accepted as a nominee.

Cast
 Frederik de Groot as Johan Schults
 Leen Jongewaard as Eskens
 Coen Flink as Hammer
 Sacco van der Made as Ballegooyen
 Hein Boele as Cohen
 Geert de Jong as Mies Evertse
 Liane Saalborn as Juffrouw Schölvink
 Bram van der Vlugt as Van Dale
 Bernard Droog as Poerstamper
 Femke Boersma as Moeder Poerstamper
 Dick van den Toorn as Piet Poerstamper
 Peter Römer as Kees Poerstamper
 Rutger Hauer as August Schultz

See also
 List of submissions to the 51st Academy Awards for Best Foreign Language Film
 List of Dutch submissions for the Academy Award for Best Foreign Language Film

References

External links
 

1978 films
1978 drama films
Dutch drama films
1970s Dutch-language films
Films about Dutch resistance
Dutch World War II films